IEEE Transactions on Professional Communication is a peer-reviewed journal publishing four times a year since 1957 by the IEEE Professional Communication Society. Readers include engineers, scientists, technical and professional writers, information designers, managers, and others working as scholars, educators, and practitioners in the effective communication of technical and business information.

See also

IEEE Communications Letters
IEEE Communications Surveys and Tutorials
IEEE Transactions on Communications
IEEE Journal on Selected Areas in Communications
IEEE Transactions on Education
IEEE Transactions on Information Theory

References

External links
 
 IEEE Transactions on Professional Communication at IEEE Xplore
 IEEE Transactions on Professional Communication at ResearchGate

Transactions on Computers
Communication journals
English-language journals
Publications established in 1957
Quarterly journals